The 1963–64 season is FC Lokomotiv Gorna Oryahovitsa's 1st season in A PFG.

First-team squad 

 27/0
 5/0
 30/0
 28/0
 26/0
 14/1
 30/0
 20/0
 10/0
 10/0

 28/3
 27/5
 26/9
 23/4
 21/2
 15/3
 9/1
 3/0
 2/1
 1/0

Fixtures

League 
The team is finished 16th after 30 games in his first "A"group's season.

Cup
Only luck saved Levski Sofia from early elimination in Bulgarian Cup against Lokomotiv GO, after the outcome of the game was decided by penalties.

1/16 finals

1/8 finals

League standings

References

External links 
 1963–64 Bulgarian Cup
 1963–64 A PFG
 Lokomotiv Gorna Oryahovitsa official website

FC Lokomotiv Gorna Oryahovitsa seasons
Lokomotiv Gorna Oryahovitsa